Men's 1500m races for blind & visually impaired athletes at the 2004 Summer Paralympics were held in the Athens Olympic Stadium from 19 to 22 September. Events were held in two disability classes.

T11

The T11 event consisted of a single race. It was won by Mustapha El Aouzari, representing .

Final Round
22 Sept. 2004, 18:25

T13

The T13 event consisted of 2 heats and a final. It was won by Maher Bouallegue, representing .

1st Round

Heat 1
19 Sept. 2004, 20:50

Heat 2
19 Sept. 2004, 20:59

Final Round
21 Sept. 2004, 18:20

References

M